John Metcalf (1919-2007) was an Australian rugby league footballer who played in the 1940s.

Metcalf was a local rugby league footballer from Cessnock, New South Wales. He enlisted into the Australian Army in 1942 and was initially sent to Arncliffe in Sydney, and trialled with St. George in 1943. 

He played two seasons with the Saints before transferring to Balmain in 1945. He played with both clubs while juggling duties with the AIF. He retired after receiving a badly broken leg in game late in the 1946 season, which ruled him out of the Balmain premiership winning team of 1946.

Melcalf died on 6 November 2007.

References

1919 births
2007 deaths
Australian rugby league players
Australian military personnel of World War II
St. George Dragons players
Balmain Tigers players
Rugby league locks
Rugby league players from Cessnock, New South Wales